Adilang is a town in the Northern Region of Uganda.

Location
The town is in Adilang sub-county, Agago District, Acholi sub-region. The coordinates of Adilang are:2° 44' 24.00"N, 33° 28' 48.00"E (Latitude:2.7400; Longitude:33.4800).

Overview
Adilang is an urban center and administered by the Adilang Town Council, an urban local government.

Points of interest
The following points of interest are located inside the town or near its edges:
 offices of Adilang Town council
 offices of Adilang sub-county
 Adilang central market
 Gulu-Abim road, passing through town in a west–east direction
 Adilang-Naamokoro road, making a T-junction with the Gulu-Abim road, in the middle of town.

See also
Patongo

References

External links
 Location of Adilang At Google Maps

Agago District
Populated places in Northern Region, Uganda